8 Flavahz is an all-female dance crew originally based in both Honolulu, Hawaii and Los Angeles, California. They are best known for being the runners-up of the seventh season of MTV's America's Best Dance Crew.

The crew consists of eight members: Angel Gibbs, Camren Bicondova, Charlize Glass, Jaira Miller, Kaelynn Gobert-Harris, Summer Waikiki, Tamara Rapp and Tiara Rapp.

Outside of the crew, Bicondova portrayed young Selina Kyle/Catwoman in the Batman prequel TV series Gotham from 2014 to 2019.

History

Before 8 Flavahz
Before forming 8 Flavahz with its current lineup, the crew was known as Flavahs Crew and consisted of eight girls from the Hawaiian dance studio 24VII. The original crew had auditioned for the sixth season of America's Best Dance Crew, but did not make the cut. Although they did not make it onto the show in season 6, they were encouraged to return to try out for the next season by ABDC judge D-Trix.

Formation
In 2011, after failing to make it onto the sixth season of MTV's America's Best Dance Crew, the Hawaiian girls - twin sisters Tiara and Tamara, Camren, and Summer - attended a dance convention in Los Angeles, where they met their L.A. counterparts - Kaelynn, Jaira, Angel, and Charlize. The Hawaiian girls then invited the four L.A. girls to join them and their crew to compete in World of Dance Hawaii. Under the name Flavahs and Friends, they competed in World of Dance Hawaii and placed in third. Three of the Hawaiian girls - Tiara, Tamara, and Summer - were also a part of another group that was competing in the same competition, named 24VII Danceforce, in which they were crowned the winners. After placing third in World of Dance Hawaii, it was decided that the four Hawaiian girls would form a new group with the four L.A. girls and they were officially dubbed 8 Flavahz. With their newly formed group, the girls were ready to audition once again for the next season of America's Best Dance Crew, placing second in the competition.

Members

America's Best Dance Crew

Appearances

Movies

Music videos

Television

References

External links
 Official website

Dance companies in the United States
America's Best Dance Crew contestants
American hip hop dance groups